Carondelet  is a neighborhood in the extreme southeastern portion of St. Louis, Missouri.  It was incorporated as an independent city in 1851 and was annexed by the City of St. Louis in 1870.  As of the 2000 Census, the neighborhood has a population of 9,960 people.

Name
Carondelet was named after Baron Carondelet, the governor of the Spanish colony Upper Louisiana. The community also held a number of names and nicknames over the centuries, including: Delor's Village, Catalan's Prairie, Louisbourg, Vide Poche, and Sugarloaf.

History 
Carondelet was founded in 1767 by Clement Delor de Treget who was born in Cahors, Quercy in southern France.  He obtained a grant from St. Ange and built a stone house.  The village was first known as Delor's Village.  Afterward, it was known as Catalan's Prairie, named for Louis Catalan, an early settler.  Later the village was called Louisbourg, most likely in honor of Louis XVI, the king of France (1774-1793).  It is said that shortly after the territory passed from French to Spanish hands, Treget wished to have his commission as captain of the militia renewed.  Since he was French and Baron de Carondelet, the governor-general of Louisiana, was in Spanish service, he feared that his commission might be refused, so he flattered Carondelet by naming the village for him and received his commission.

In the early days, the village was given the nickname Vide Poche. This name is often mistakenly translated as "empty pocket", which would rather be "Poche Vide" in French. This is a folk etymology that rests on a history of poverty among its inhabitants. As it goes, Carondelet citizens would have to buy flour from St. Louis, and often they could not pay for it, for their pockets were empty.  Another explanation translates the nickname to mean "Empties Pocket," which makes sense in French, thus conveying the idea that it was a place where the pockets of those visiting would be emptied.  The inhabitants of Carondelet were noted for their hospitality and fondness for all kinds of sports and amusements.  The St. Louis visitor would return home with emptied pockets - the Carondelet men may have had fleeter horses or have been more skillful card players.  When a St. Louisan was asked to visit Carondelet on Sunday afternoon, he would reply, "A quoi sert, c'est un vide poche." (meaning: "Of what use, is a place that empties pocket).  Another nickname applied to Carondelet was "Pain de Sucre" or the "Sugarloaf."

An in-depth study of several instances of Vide Poche in North America shed light on the complex history of this place name. It turns out that this name migrated to Missouri from the Saint Lawrence Valley and initially meant "the mill", for "Vide-Poche" was documented to be a nickname in New France for the mill and the original population in the area mainly was from Canada. This St. Louis Vide Poche is indeed known to have harbored a mill in its very beginning. It seems however that another identical compound meaning "pickpocket" added to the semantic load of this place name.

In a 1799 census, Carondelet was described as "two leagues below St. Louis" and having a population of 181 white residents and 3 African slaves.

Carondelet was incorporated in 1832, merged with the first ward of St. Louis under the name of South St. Louis in 1860, and annexed to St. Louis in 1870.

Carondelet is the first foundation of the Sisters of St. Joseph of Carondelet, a Congregation, with French roots, who arrived in America in 1836.

The community is particularly associated with processing lead from the Southeast Missouri Lead District.  The affiliation began in the 1840s with the production lead shot shipped in via the St. Louis, Iron Mountain and Southern Railway.

In 1873, Susan Blow founded the first continuous, publicly funded kindergarten in the United States, at Carondolet's Des Peres School.

During the American Civil War, 32 ironclad gunboats for the Union Army and Navy were produced at the James Buchanan Eads-owned Union Marine Works shipyards, including four of the initial City class ironclads: St. Louis, Carondelet, Pittsburgh, and Louisville.  The three other City class gunboats (Cairo, Mound City, and ) were subcontracted out by Eads and built in Mound City, Illinois.

From 1870-1930, Hertz Metal Company produced baling wire and also operated a lead smelter.  In 1876 Provident Chemical Works became a world leader in the production of phosphates from its Carondelet Plant in a process that initially involved lead.  In the 1920s the plant was purchased by Swann Chemical Company, and then in 1935 by Monsanto. The River des Peres was rerouted through the plant in the 1930s as part of a Works Progress Administration project.  Monsanto spun off the production to Solutia.  In 2000 it became part of Astaris and then Israel Chemical Limited.  The plant produces 250 million pounds per year of phosphate and phosphoric acid products.

Originally, the neighborhood was populated predominantly by French and then later German immigrants.  Today the neighborhood contains a mixture of industrial uses along the Mississippi River and residential and commercial uses further from the river.  Because it once existed as an independent village, the neighborhood contains some of the oldest homes in St. Louis.  Most of the housing was constructed between 1880 and 1930.  Housing in the area ranges from modest single-story cottages to apartment buildings, to larger single-family homes.  Most of the housing is of brick construction.

Demographics
In 2020 Carondelet's population was 43.1% White, 39.3% Black, 0.5% Native American, 1.5% Asian, 9.9% Two or More Races, and 5.6% Some Other Race. 9.6% of the population was of Hispanic or Latino origin.

See also
 Carondelet Park
 Sugarloaf Mound 
 Holly Hills, St. Louis
 Susan Blow
 Henry Taylor Blow
 Quinn Chapel
 Dred Scott
 Neighborhoods of St. Louis
 USS Carondelet, a Civil War gunboat named after the town

References

External links 
 Carondelet neighborhood website

Neighborhoods in St. Louis
French colonial settlements of Upper Louisiana
Missouri populated places on the Mississippi River
Former municipalities in Missouri